Koshi Pradesh is a province of Nepal. It is located in easternmost part of Nepal. It is surrounded by Tibet of China to the north, the Indian states of Sikkim and West Bengal to the east and Bihar to the south and Bagmati Province and Madhesh Province to the west.

Koshi Pradesh occupies most of the area of what was previously Eastern Development Region. EDR had 3 zones and 16 districts. The districts were further subdivided into municipalities and village development committees.

Administrative structure
Koshi Province is divided into 14 districts and districts are subdivided into municipalities.

Districts
Koshi Province is divided into 14 districts.

Municipality
There are two types of Municipality:
Urban Municipality (Nagarpalika)
Metropolitan City
Sub-Metropolitan City
Municipality
Rural Municipality (Gaunpalika)

Metropolitan City
There is only one metropolitan city in Koshi Province.

Sub-Metropolitan City
There are 2 sub-metropolitan cities in Koshi Province.

Municipalities
There are 46 municipalities in Koshi Province.

Rural Municipality
There are 88 rural municipalities in Koshi Province:

Judiciary

High court

Biratnagar High Court is the high court of Koshi Province. The high court established according to the new constitution of Nepal. Article 139 of the constitution says “there shall be a High Court in each state”. According to article 300 (3): “The High Courts set forth in Article 139 shall be established no later than one year after the date of commencement of this Constitution. The Appellate Courts existing at the time of commencement of this Constitution shall be dissolved after the establishment of such courts”. The government of Nepal transformed the existing appellate court in Biratnagar on 14 September 2016. As per the government decision, there will be extended benches in Illam, Dhankuta and Okhaldhunga under the high court in Biratnagar. 

Tej Bahadur KC is the current chief judge of Biratnagar High Court.

District court

Clause 148, 149, 150 and 151 of Constitution of Nepal, 2015 defines District Courts, appointment, qualification, terms and remuneration of chief justices.

There are 14 district courts in Koshi Province. Each district has one District court.

Legislature

Pradesh Sabha (Provincial assembly) of Koshi Province is the unicameral legislative assembly.

Constituency
Koshi Province have 56 constituencies (provincial seats) under the FPtP (First-Past-the-Post).

District Coordination Committee
District Coordination Committee is the legislative body at district level. The Head of a district development committee is elected by the district assembly. The DCC acts as an executive to the district Assembly. The DCC coordinates with the Provincial Assembly to establish coordination between the Provincial Assembly and rural municipalities and municipalities and to settle disputes, if any, of political nature. It also maintains coordination between the provincial and Federal government and among the local bodies in the district. It also monitors development within the district.

Executive 
The head of the provincial government is the Chief Minister, who is the parliamentary party leader of the party with the majority or the highest number of seats in the assembly. The assembly can force the resignation of the chief minister with a vote of no confidence.

District Administration

District Administration Office (DAO) is a general administration of government in each district. The Ministry of Home Affairs appoints a chief district officer (CDO) in each DAO.

See also
 List of cities in Nepal

References

External links
 Kathmandupost.ekantipur.com

Koshi Province
Subdivisions of Nepal